"Gonna Make You Sweat (Everybody Dance Now)" is a song by American dance music group C+C Music Factory, released in late 1990 as the debut and lead single from their first album, Gonna Make You Sweat (1990). The song is sung by singer Martha Wash and rapper Freedom Williams. It charted internationally and achieved great success in the United States, Austria, Germany, and Sweden, where it reached number one on the charts.

Background and writing
Robert Clivillés wrote and produced an instrumental track that was to become "Gonna Make You Sweat". He offered the track to vocal trio Trilogy, but when they declined to record it, Clivillés decided to use the track for his and David Cole's C+C Music Factory. The rap verse was performed by Freedom Williams and the female vocals by Martha Wash.

The music video showed Zelma Davis lip-syncing to Wash's vocal parts. After discovering that the group was using model-turned-singer Zelma Davis in the music video, Wash (who does not appear in the video) unsuccessfully attempted to negotiate with the producers of the C+C Music Factory for sleeve credits and royalties. Additionally, the song used an edited compilation of vocal parts that Wash recorded in June 1990 for an unrelated demonstration tape. On December 11, 1991, Wash filed a lawsuit in the Los Angeles Superior Court against C+C Music Factory's Robert Clivillés and David Cole, charging the producers and their record company, Sony Music Entertainment, with fraud, deceptive packaging, and commercial appropriation. The case was eventually settled in 1994, and as a result of the settlement, Sony made an unprecedented request of MTV to add a disclaimer that credited Wash for vocals and Zelma Davis (who lip-synced Wash's vocals in the official music video) for "visualization" to the "Gonna Make You Sweat" music video.

Recording
Having previously worked with David Cole doing some demos in the past, Martha Wash recorded her vocals for "Gonna Make You Sweat" as a demo song. She was told that it was for another artist. Only Robert Clivillés was present in the studio during recording. Wash had to phone Cole for instructions on how to sing, before recording her vocals. She stated in 2017:

Chart performance
The song held the top spot on the US Billboard Hot Dance Club Play chart for five weeks in December 1990, and topped the Billboard Hot 100 for two weeks in 1991 (February 9 and February 16.) It also topped the Canadian RPM Dance/Urban chart. In Europe, it peaked at number-one in Austria, Germany, the Netherlands and Switzerland. The single made it to the top 10 also in Belgium, Denmark, Finland, Greece (#2), Iceland, Norway, Spain (#2), Sweden and the United Kingdom, as well as on the Eurochart Hot 100, where it hit number two. In the UK, "Gonna Make You Sweat (Everybody Dance Now)" peaked at number three in its sixth week at the UK Singles Chart, on January 13, 1991, a full month before its American pop success. It even found success in the urban contemporary music world as it crossed over to the R&B charts where it reached number-one for a week. Additionally, it was a top 20 hit in Ireland, a top 30 hit in Italy and a top 50 hit in France. In Oceania, the single peaked at number two and three in New Zealand and Australia. It earned a platinum record in the US, after 1 million singles were sold there.

Reception
When it was first released, "Gonna Make You Sweat (Everybody Dance Now)" enjoyed widespread commercial success. Topping charts in several countries, the song dominated the airwaves while its accompanying music video received constant rotation on MTV.

Music critics praised "Gonna Make You Sweat" for Freedom Williams' Ice-T-like rap delivery in conjunction with Martha Wash's powerful, exuberant, post-disco vocals and deemed the song as a bona fide classic. Bill Lamb from About.com said that the vocal performances "along with state-of-the-art house rhythms" made up "one of the most exhilarating songs of the year." AllMusic editor Jose F. Promis described it as "unstoppable" and noted that it "incorporated dance, house, and hip hop beats, wailing diva vocals, and rap to come up with one of the year's most exciting hits." Larry Flick from Billboard wrote that "new act featuring hot producers Robert Clivillés and David Cole serves up a potential multiformat smash with this slammin', guitar-driven hip-hopper, fueled by a stellar appearance from former Weather Girl Martha Wash." He also described it as "a virtually flawless stew of hip-hop bass and percussion, deft rhyming courtesy of newcomer Freedom Williams, and ripping vocals by supreme diva Martha Wash".

Penelope Layland from The Canberra Times stated that the song "is highly percussive, with an urgent beat contrasting well with the lazy vocal delivery." Marisa Fox from Entertainment Weekly said it "sounds like a composite of 1990's most memorable pop/dance tunes — a screeching bass line (reminiscent of Snap's "The Power Jam"), wailing lead vocals sung by former Weather Girl Martha Wash, and up-tempo beats that reek of Technotronic." Dave Sholin from the Gavin Report noted that it is "difficult to package any more excitement into this release which exemplifies what fresh music is all about." A. Scott Galloway from The Network Forty commented that the song is "an electrifying debut from Robert Clivillés & David Cole, the production team that brought you Seduction. With singer Freedom Williams up front demanding "Everybody Dance Now," the song is simply the best party starter to come along in months. It doesn't hurt that it's right in line sound-wise with past chart top hits like Black Box's "Everybody Everybody" and Snap's "The Power", either." A reviewer from People Magazine stated that the track "deserves its Top 10 status, along with hit-to-be "Things That Make You Go Hmmm..." blending rap, rock and dance riffs."

However, over the years, the song came to be used and/or referenced innumerable times by the entertainment industry, to the point that it became something of a musical, pop culture cliché. By 2007, the song was criticized by AllMusic as "the lazy Hollywood 'go-to' song for supposed laugh-filled, irony-fueled dance numbers."

Music video
The accompanying music video for "Gonna Make You Sweat (Everybody Dance Now)" was directed by German director Marcus Nispel and featured dancers performing in front of a white backdrop. Zelma Davis lip-syncs to the recorded vocals of Martha Wash, who doesn't appear in the video. A short clip of Double Dutch is shown near the end. The video received heavy rotation on MTV Europe and was later published by Vevo on YouTube in October 2009.

Impact and legacy
VH1 placed "Gonna Make You Sweat" at number nine on its list of "100 Greatest Dance Songs" in 2000 and at number 36 on its list of "100 Greatest Songs of the 90s" in 2007.

Accolades

In popular culture
The song has been played in many films, including The Super, Sister Act, Man of the House (1995), Man of the House (2005), Space Jam, Something's Gotta Give, Old School, Robots, Jarhead, Chicken Little, A Fairly Odd Summer, Evan Almighty, Detention and Pain and Gain. It has also played in films' trailers, including Superstar, The Adventures of Pluto Nash, Flushed Away, Madagascar: Escape 2 Africa and Borat Subsequent Moviefilm. The song is also sung by King Julien in the 2012 film Madagascar 3: Europe's Most Wanted.

It was used in the TV episode "Alpha" of The Flash (1990-1991); the episodes "The Big Four-Oh" and "Banks Shot" of The Fresh Prince Of Bel-Air; "Meet By-Product" in King of Queens; in an episode of So You Think You Can Dance; in a 2010 episode and the 2011 season premiere of The Ellen DeGeneres Show; in an episode of The Office, "Cafe Disco", in which both Andy and Kelly had a dance-off; in an episode of American Dad!, When a Stan Loves a Woman; in the 30 Rock episode "Retreat to Move Forward"; and it is played twice during a 1997 episode of The Simpsons, "Homer's Phobia",  as well as used in "Love Is a Many Strangled Thing". Its lyrics are interpolated as "Everybody read now" in the "Cutting the Cord" episode of TV series The Middle, when Brick dances as a bookmark. The song appears in season 3, episode 1 of Sex Education. It also heard on Nickelodeon's The Amanda Show.

The track opens the fourth episode of The People v. O.J. Simpson: American Crime Story, where through a flashback scene O. J. Simpson's former party lifestyle (alongside Robert Kardashian) is contrasted with his current cell conditions.

The song is briefly heard in the 2014 film A Fairly Odd Summer.

The song appears in 2016 and 2022 television commercials for Applebee's. It also appears in a 2015 commercial for Target, a 2017 one for Fabletics, a 2022 one for DampRid moisture absorber, and slightly rewritten for a 1999 Pringles commercial.

The song and video were parodied in the 1994 hip-hop mockumentary Fear of a Black Hat as "Come and Pet the P.U.S.S.Y." — a solo single for rapper Ice Cold (Rusty Cundieff) — as well as being included on the film's soundtrack album.

According to the 2017 "Ken's New Intern" episode of Dr. Ken, the character Damona Watkins sang the vocal "Everybody Dance Now".

It appears in NBA 2K18 soundtrack.

The Sweat Invaders covered the song for Just Dance 3, and it can be played in the game, as well as in Just Dance Wii 2 in Japan.

Ice dancers Tessa Virtue and Scott Moir performed to the song in the Figure Skating Exhibition Gala at the 2010 Winter Olympics after winning the gold medal.

It was also included in ESPN's sports-themed compilation album Jock Jams, Volume 1 in 1995.

It was also heard in Canadian commercials for Rogers Plus, and Telus which involved rabbits dancing.

It was also heard in the holiday TV special Shrek the Halls.

Track listings
 7" single
 "Gonna Make You Sweat (Everybody Dance Now)" (Radio Version) – 4:06
 "Gonna Make You Sweat (Everybody Dance Now)" (In Your Face Mix Instrumental) – 4:54
			
 12" maxi
 "Gonna Make You Sweat (Everybody Dance Now)" (The Slammin' Vocal Club Mix) – 6:50
 "Gonna Make You Sweat (Everybody Dance Now)" (Clivillés & Cole DJ's Choice Mix) – 5:00
 "Gonna Make You Sweat (Everybody Dance Now)" (The Master Mix Instrumental) – 4:54

 CD single
 "Gonna Make You Sweat (Everybody Dance Now)" (Radio Version) – 4:06
 "Gonna Make You Sweat (Everybody Dance Now)" (in your face mix instrumental) – 4:54

Charts and certifications

Weekly charts

Year-end charts

Decade-end charts

All-time charts

Certifications

Cover versions
 "Gonna Make You Sweat (Everybody Dance Now)" was reworked by French DJ Bob Sinclar in his 2006 song "Rock This Party (Everybody Dance Now)", which became a hit in many countries including the UK, Finland and France where it reached number 3 and in Belgium where it topped both the Ultratop 50 Flanders and Wallonia charts.
 Russian group Little Big covered the track for the soundtrack of the film Borat Subsequent Moviefilm, and it can be heard in some of the trailers, and is featured in full during the closing credits. In Da Ali G Show, this was Borat's favorite song.

See also
List of number-one hits of 1991 (Austria)
List of number-one hits of 1991 (Germany)
List of number-one singles of the 1990s (Sweden)
List of Billboard Hot 100 number-one singles of 1991
List of number-one dance singles of 1990 (U.S.)
List of number-one R&B singles of 1991 (U.S.)

References

1990 songs
1990 debut singles
1991 singles
Billboard Hot 100 number-one singles
Cashbox number-one singles
C+C Music Factory songs
Martha Wash songs
Music videos directed by Marcus Nispel
Music Week number-one dance singles
Number-one singles in Austria
Number-one singles in Germany
Number-one singles in Sweden
Songs written by Robert Clivillés
2012 singles
Justice Crew songs
Bonnie Anderson (singer) songs
Columbia Records singles
Songs about dancing